Hastings station is an Amtrak intercity train station in Hastings, Nebraska. It is served daily by the California Zephyr.

The station was built as Hastings Burlington Station in 1902. Thomas Rogers Kimball designed it in the Spanish Colonial Revival style for the Burlington Railroad. It was renovated in 1966 and 2000 and was placed on the National Register of Historic Places in 1978. Part of the building is leased to commercial tenants.

References

External links 

Hastings station – USA Rail Guide (TrainWeb)

Amtrak stations in Nebraska
Buildings and structures in Hastings, Nebraska
Former Chicago, Burlington and Quincy Railroad stations
Spanish Colonial Revival architecture in the United States
Railway stations in the United States opened in 1902

Railway stations on the National Register of Historic Places in Nebraska
1902 establishments in Nebraska
National Register of Historic Places in Adams County, Nebraska